David Wayne Toms (born January 4, 1967) is an American professional golfer who currently plays on the PGA Tour Champions. From 1992 to 2017, Toms was a member of the PGA Tour, where he won 13 events, including one major, the 2001 PGA Championship. He was in the top 10 of the Official World Golf Ranking for 175 weeks between 2001 and 2006, and ranked as high as fifth in 2002 and 2003.

Early life and amateur career
Toms was born in Monroe in northeastern Louisiana. He is the son of Thomas Edward "Buster" Toms of Minden in northwestern Louisiana. Toms won the 15-17 Boys' event at the 1984 Junior World Golf Championships. Toms also played little league baseball with future Major League Baseball players Albert Belle and Ben McDonald. After graduating from Airline High School in Bossier City, Louisiana, he attended Louisiana State University in Baton Rouge, where he was a member of the golf team.

Professional career

1989–98: Early years and first win
In 1991, Toms finished T23 at the PGA Tour qualifying school to earn his first full tour card for the 1992 season. Toms made his first three cuts on tour including a third-place finish at the Northern Telecom Open, although this was the only top 10 he would earn all season. The following season was also a struggle for Toms as he made just 12 of 32 cuts for the season, of which three were top-10 finishes. In 1994, Toms' lack of success continued on the PGA Tour and he lost his playing rights for the 1995 season.

In 1995, Toms played the entire season on the Nike Tour (now the Korn Ferry Tour) with greater success, winning two tournaments, the Greater Greenville Classic and the Wichita Open. This success earned Toms his PGA Tour card for the 1996 season.

Upon his return to the PGA Tour in 1996, Toms had a disappointing season with just two top 10s. However, he did manage to qualify for his first major championship of his career at the 1996 U.S. Open, where he missed the cut.

In 1997, Toms won his first PGA Tour event at the Quad City Classic, winning by three strokes over Brandel Chamblee. He followed this success in the 1998 season with a runner-up finish at the Tucson Chrysler Classic. At his first visit to Augusta National, he recorded his best finish in a major championship at the time with a T-6 at the Masters. In his defense of the Quad City Classic title, Toms finished fourth.

1999–2000: Three more wins
In 1999, Toms enjoyed seven top-10 finishes on the PGA Tour. In September, he won his second title at the Sprint International, by three strokes over David Duval. Toms almost added another title the following week when he narrowly missed out at the Reno-Tahoe Open, finishing in T-2 behind Notah Begay III. Toms did, however, win his third PGA Tour title a month later at the Buick Challenge, defeating Stuart Appleby by three strokes.

In 2000, Toms made 26 of 31 cuts, including a tie for fourth at The Open Championship. He won the Michelob Championship at Kingsmill, defeating Canadian Mike Weir in a sudden-death playoff, giving Toms his fourth Tour victory.

2001: PGA Championship

The standout year of Toms' career came in 2001. He had nine top-10 finishes and three wins on tour, one of which was his first major championship. Toms won the Compaq Classic of New Orleans by two strokes over Phil Mickelson for his fifth PGA Tour title. That summer, Toms won a major, the PGA Championship, by one stroke over Mickelson. His winning score of 265 in the 2001 PGA Championship was the lowest absolute 72-hole score ever recorded in a major championship, until Henrik Stenson shot 264 in the 2016 Open Championship. Toms followed up his first major win by successfully defending his title at the Michelob Championship at Kingsmill. At the last event of the year, Toms entered a four-man playoff at The Tour Championship where he, Sergio García and Ernie Els lost on the first extra hole to Mike Weir.

2002–06: Five more wins 
In 2002, Toms lost in a playoff at the season opening Mercedes Championship to García when the Spaniard made birdie on the first extra hole. He did record a further 12 top-10 finishes with runner -up finishes at the MasterCard Colonial and the Buick Challenge followed by a sole third-place finish at The Tour Championship.

Toms finished runner-up at the WGC-Accenture Match Play Championship in 2003 to Tiger Woods, losing 2&1, and also finished tied for eighth at The Masters. At the Wachovia Championship, he won his eighth PGA Tour title, by two strokes over Robert Gamez, and then recorded his best showing ever at the U.S. Open, finishing T-5. A few weeks later, Toms won his ninth PGA Tour title at the FedEx St. Jude Classic by three strokes over Nick Price.

In 2004, he defended his FedEx St. Jude Classic by finishing six strokes clear of American Bob Estes for his 10th victory on the PGA Tour. Despite this win, Toms endured a steady yet unspectacular season earning over 2.3 million dollars.

Toms enjoyed a much better start to the 2005 season in which he had top-10 finishes in five of his first seven events, including a win at the WGC-Accenture Match Play Championship to record his first World Golf Championship victory. He defeated fellow American Chris DiMarco 6&5 in the 36-hole final on Sunday for his 11th PGA Tour win. Along the way, Toms defeated notables including Phil Mickelson, Adam Scott and Ian Poulter. Later in the season, he almost defended his FedEx St. Jude Classic title for a third successive year but finished one stroke behind Justin Leonard.

Early in 2006, Toms won his 12th PGA Tour title at the Sony Open in Hawaii, finishing five strokes ahead of Chad Campbell and Rory Sabbatini. He followed up this early season form with a T-2 finish at the Ford Championship at Doral behind Tiger Woods and then a T-3 finish a week later at The Honda Classic. Toms' form dipped during the rest of season, only recording a further two top-10 finishes.

2007–12: Injuries and comeback
In 2007, Toms had solid season with a succession of top-10 finishes, most notably a ninth-place finish at The Masters and an equal-best T-5 at the U.S. Open. Toms made just over $2 million in prize money and finished 33rd in the FedEx Cup standings.

Toms struggled during the 2008 season with injuries that forced him to miss large parts of the season and underperform. He only participated in 20 events during the season with only one top 10. He finished the season 136th on the FedEx Cup standings, making just under $800,000.

Toms enjoyed a much better season in 2009, with three runner-up finishes at the Sony Open in Hawaii, St. Jude Classic and the Travelers Championship amongst four other top-10 finishes. This form earned Toms a place in the season-ending The Tour Championship. He would finish 19th in the FedEx Cup standings with earnings over $3 million.

In 2010, Toms had just two top-10 finishes, his best placing coming at the Wyndham Championship where he finished in second place, one stroke behind winner Arjun Atwal. Toms made it to the third FedEx Cup playoff event the BMW Championship but did not make it into the top 30 to advance and eventually finished the season 55th in the standings.

Toms started the 2011 season well with a T-5 at the Mayakoba Golf Classic at Riviera Maya-Cancun and a T-3 at the Arnold Palmer Invitational. Toms then came close to his first PGA Tour win in five years at The Players Championship where he eventually lost on the first extra hole to South Korean K. J. Choi. This came despite leading the tournament for the majority of rounds two, three and four. Toms held the lead for the entire final round until he reached the par five 16th hole where he found the water with his second shot. This enabled Choi to take a one shot lead down the 18th hole; however Toms would make a birdie to Choi's par to take the event into a sudden-death playoff. At the first extra hole, the 17th, both players found the green with their tee shots. They would both go on to run their birdie attempts past the hole, but Toms would also see his par putt lip out from four feet, allowing Choi to make a three-foot putt for the victory.

Toms bounced back the week after his playoff loss to win the Crowne Plaza Invitational at Colonial by one shot over Charlie Wi. Toms tied the PGA Tour scoring record for 36 holes after shooting a pair of 8-under-par 62s for a seven shot lead at the halfway stage. Toms' lead disappeared after a third round 74 when he trailed Wi by one stroke entering the final round. However, in the final round he shot a 67, which included a holed-out eagle from the fairway on the 11th hole for a one stroke victory. This was Toms' first win in over five years on the PGA Tour. The win guaranteed Toms a place in the U.S. Open and moved him up to 28th in the Official World Golf Ranking.

In June 2012, Toms recorded his best-ever performance in a U.S. Open when he finished T-4. Toms had been one of the co-leaders after 36 holes at one under par alongside fellow Americans Tiger Woods and Jim Furyk, but his challenge fell apart on day three when he found himself five over for his first six holes on his way to a 76. Toms did perform well on Sunday with a two-under round of 68, but fell short by two strokes.

Other ventures

Golf course design
Toms owns a golf course design business, which he describes as what he plans to do after his playing days are over. His early works, all in Louisiana, were as a player-consultant, and in renovation and redesign of existing courses. The first course for which he was the lead designer was Carter Plantation in Springfield, Louisiana.

Philanthropy
In 2003, Toms created the David Toms Foundation for the purpose of helping underprivileged, abused and abandoned children. Grants are made to programs that are designed to bolster a child's self-esteem, and help him or her develop into a productive citizen. His foundation raised more than $1.5 million for Hurricane Katrina relief. For his efforts, Toms shared the 2006 Golf Writers Association of America's Charlie Bennett Award with fellow Louisianans Kelly Gibson and Hal Sutton. In 2013, the foundation partnered with AdvoCare to support Holy Angels, a Louisiana non-profit, helping those with developmental disabilities.

Personal life
Toms currently resides in Shreveport in northwestern Louisiana. He and wife, Sonya, have two children, Carter and Anna.  In 2015, his son Carter signed to play for Louisiana State University.

Professional wins (20)

PGA Tour wins (13)

PGA Tour playoff record (1–3)

Nike Tour wins (2)

Nike Tour playoff record (2–1)

Other wins (2)

Other playoff record (1–1)

PGA Tour Champions wins (3)

PGA Tour Champions playoff record (1–0)

Major championships

Wins (1)

Results timeline

CUT = missed the half-way cut
WD = withdrew
DQ = disqualified
"T" = tied for place

Summary

Most consecutive cuts made – 6 (2000 Masters – 2001 U.S. Open)
Longest streak of top-10s – 2 (twice)

Results in The Players Championship

CUT = missed the halfway cut
"T" indicates a tie for a place

World Golf Championships

Wins (1)

Results timeline

1Cancelled due to 9/11

QF, R16, R32, R64 = Round in which player lost in match play
"T" = Tied
NT = No tournament
WD = Withdrew
Note that the HSBC Champions did not become a WGC event until 2009.

Senior major championships

Wins (1)

Results timeline

CUT = missed the halfway cut
"T" indicates a tie for a place
NT = No tournament due to COVID-19 pandemic

U.S. national team professional appearances
Ryder Cup: 2002, 2004, 2006
World Cup: 2002
Presidents Cup: 2003 (tie), 2005 (winners), 2007 (winners), 2011 (winners)

See also
1991 PGA Tour Qualifying School graduates
1995 Nike Tour graduates
List of men's major championships winning golfers

References

External links

David Toms Foundation Official Site

American male golfers
LSU Tigers golfers
PGA Tour golfers
PGA Tour Champions golfers
Winners of men's major golf championships
Winners of senior major golf championships
Ryder Cup competitors for the United States
Korn Ferry Tour graduates
Golfers from Shreveport, Louisiana
Airline High School alumni
Sportspeople from Monroe, Louisiana
Sportspeople from Bossier City, Louisiana
1967 births
Living people